Sendai Station is the name of two train stations in Japan:

 Sendai Station (Miyagi) (仙台駅) in Miyagi Prefecture
 Sendai Station (Kagoshima) (川内駅) in Kagoshima Prefecture